Ștefan Ciobanu (born 11 November 1883 – 28 February 1950) was a Romanian historian and academician, author of some important works about ancient Romanian literature, Romanian culture in Basarabia under Russian occupation, Bessarabian demography, fervent advocate of the introduction of the Romanian language in the schools of Bessarabia, vice-president of the Romanian Academy between 1944–1948. He served as Minister of Education (1917–1918) of the short-lived Moldavian Democratic Republic.

Biography  
Ciobanu was born on 11 November 1883 in Talmaza, at the time in Tighina County, Bessarabia, Russian Empire, now in Moldova. He studied at Kiev University (1907-1912). Ciobanu served as the Minister of Education in the Pantelimon Erhan Cabinet, the Daniel Ciugureanu Cabinet, and the Petru Cazacu Cabinet. He died on 28 February 1950 in Bucharest, Romania

Works
 "La continuité roumaine dans la Bessarabie annexée en  1812 par la Russie", Bulletin de la Section historique de l'Académie roumaine, nr. 1/1920
 Cultura românească în Basarabia sub stăpânirea rusă, Chișinău, 1923
 "Biserici vechi din Basarabia din bibliotecile rusești", Anuarul Comisiei Monumentelor istorice. Secția Basarabia, Chișinău, 1924
 Chișinăul (monografie). Chișinău, 1925
 Dimitrie Cantemir in Rusia, Cultura Natională, București,1925.
 Basarabia. Monografie sub îngrijirea lui Ștefan Ciobanu. Chișinău, 1926
 Cetatea Tighina// Anuarul Comisiunii monumentelor istorice. Secția Basarabia. Chișinău, 1928
 Documente din Basarabia (with P. Visarion, Șt. Berechet; C. Tomescu, L.T. Boga), vol.1 -2, Chișinău, 1928 -1938
 Unirea Basarabiei. Studiu și documente cu privire la mișcarea națională din Basarabia la anii 1917–1918. București, 1929
 Mânăstirea Țigănești. Chișinău, 1931
 Din istoria mișcării naționale în Basarabia. Chișinău, 1933
 Din legaturile Culturale Romano-Ucrainiene: Ioannichie Galeatovschi si Literatura Romaneasca Veche,Imprimeria Nationala, Bucuresti,1938.
 Inceputurile Scrisului in Limba Româneasca, Imprimeria Națională, București,1941.
 Introducere în Istoria Literaturii Române, Orientări Metodologice, Ed. Casa Școalelor,1944
 Istoria Literaturii Române Vechi, Imprimeria Națională, București,1947; Ed. Eminescu 1989, 
 La Bessarabie. Sa population, son passé, sa culture. Bucarest, 1941; Ed. rom.: Basarabia. Populația, istoria, cultura. Chișinău, Ed. Știința, 1992
 "Un decument inedit din timurile lui Ștefan cel Mare", Revista istorică Română, vol. XIY, fasc. I, 1944
 "Domnitorul Moldovei Petru Rareș în literatura rusă veche", Revista istorică Română, vol. XIY,  fasc. III, 1945

Bibliography 
 Rusu, Dorina N., Membrii Academiei Române, 1866–1999, Editura Academiei Române, București, 1999,

External links
 Ștefan Ciobanu 
 Ștefan Ciobanu 
 Filologia română la Kiev : trecut și prezent

1883 births
1950 deaths
People from Ștefan Vodă District
People from Akkermansky Uyezd
Romanian people of Moldovan descent
Moldovan Ministers of Education
Romanian Ministers of Culture
20th-century Moldovan historians
20th-century Romanian historians
Taras Shevchenko National University of Kyiv alumni
Academic staff of the University of Bucharest
Titular members of the Romanian Academy